The Teenage Harlets was a surf garage punk band based in San Francisco. They got together in 1999 and broke up in 2008. The band was characterized by its fast, 

The Teenage Harlets gained recognition at the 2006 SXSW music festival by playing 18 shows by making appearances between bands at outdoor venues all across Austin, Texas. They completed several national tours, including multiple dates on The Vans Warped Tour minor stages.

Members
Final members:
Johnny Dismal - vocals
Atom Bomb - drums
Chris Van Dyke - guitar
Diamond D - bass

Earlier members:
Mark - guitar
Chreehos - bass
Mikey Quattro - bass
Joebot 2.0 - organ
Boss OC-3 - bass
Kid Kris - bass
Pablo Fiasco - organ
Theo Logian - bass
Buttons - bass
Rob Lawless - bass
Jason Spizz Darling - drums
Kyle Gibson - drums

Discography
The Harlets released eight CD, 7" and 12" records, including "up the fixx", their final LP on Springman Records.

I Ain't No Square (CD, 2001 Dead Girl Records)
Some Kinda Girl (7"/CD, 2002 Dead Girl Records)
Teenage Harlets/The Juvinals Split (Split with The Juvinals)(7"/CD, 2003 Dead Girl Records)
Teenage Harlets/Coppertones Split (Split with The Coppertones)(CD, 2004 Dead Dirl Records)
Teenage Harlets (EP, 2004 Dead Girl Records)
Trash Trash Trash (EP, 2005 Dead Girl Records)
Up The Fixx (12"/CD, Springman Records)

References

External links
Official website
The Teenage Harlets MySpace page

Musical groups from San Francisco